Vito P. Battista (September 7, 1908 – May 24, 1990) was an American politician who served in the New York State Assembly from the 38th district from 1969 to 1974.
He served on the Architectural and Transportation Barriers Compliance Board under president Ronald Reagan from 1984 until 1987.
He died on May 24, 1990, in Brooklyn, New York City, New York at age 81.

References

1908 births
1990 deaths
Republican Party members of the New York State Assembly
20th-century American politicians
Italian emigrants to the United States